Coonan Arms Inc. was a gun manufacturer owned by Dan Coonan that manufactured custom 1911 handguns and FAL receivers and was based out of Blaine, Minnesota.

Coonan Inc. went out of business in 2019.

Products 
 FAL Type 1 receiver
 Custom 1911 handguns

References

Firearm manufacturers of the United States
Defunct manufacturing companies based in Minnesota